Josias Basso Lisboa (born 14 April 1989) is a Brazilian footballer who plays as a defender for Caxias. Basso also holds Italian nationality by descent.

Career 
Born in Vacaria, Rio Grande do Sul, Basso started his career at Juventude. He signed a 3-year youth contract in January 2006. On 1 July 2008, he left for Grêmio Esportivo São José but on 1 September for Serie A side Reggina. He played for their Primavera youth team for a season, and made his Serie A debut on 31 May 2009, the last match of the season. Basso replaced Vincenzo Camilleri in the 64th minutes. In July 2009, he was loaned to Ravenna of Lega Pro Prima Divisione along with Antonio Rizzo and Tommaso Squillace.

One year later, on 23 February 2011, Basso signed for Bulgarian Slavia Sofia on an 18-month contract. He made his debut in the 1–1 draw against Lokomotiv Plovdiv on 2 April.

References

External links
 
 Josias Basso at ZeroZero

1989 births
Living people
Sportspeople from Rio Grande do Sul
Brazilian people of Italian descent
Citizens of Italy through descent
Brazilian footballers
Association football central defenders
Brazilian expatriate footballers
Expatriate footballers in Italy
Expatriate footballers in Bulgaria
Expatriate footballers in Cyprus
Serie A players
First Professional Football League (Bulgaria) players
Esporte Clube Juventude players
Reggina 1914 players
Ravenna F.C. players
PFC Slavia Sofia players
Enosis Neon Paralimni FC players
Cypriot Second Division players
Association football defenders